As Quatro Estações is the fourth studio album by the Brazilian rock band Legião Urbana. It was released on October 26, 1989. It is Legião Urbana's first release without bassist Renato Rocha, who was fired from the band prior to the album's recording sessions due to his lack of commitment to the group.

With over 1,9 million copies sold (730,000 in its first year), it is the band's most commercially successful album, and it was certified platinum by ABPD Six of its eleven songs enjoyed good radio airplay.

Background and production

Renato Rocha's departure 
Legião Urbana returned to the studio when they were about to achieve a million sold albums, when the commercial performance of all three previous albums were combined. Despite that, the atmosphere among members was bitter, partially due to the then recent Mané Garrincha stadium incident, but also because the situation of bassist Renato Rocha became more and more complicated. After he bought a ranch in Mendes, he would take around two hours to reach the studio in Rio de Janeiro. He skipped many sessions and, when he did come, it would take him a while to mingle with the group. Many times he asked to take the tapes home so he could create his arrangements there. Six months into the album's creation, he was fired in a meeting at label EMI-Odeon's office. Despite that, the remaining members decided he would maintain all his rights over the album.

Songwriting 
It took the album a year to be ready because the band struggled to create something that satisfied them. The situation reached a point in which Russo considered disbanding the group. However, because they had a high reputation in the label, the company gave them as much time and space as they needed. Producer Mayrton Bahia was the only one affected negatively by the delay. He was a freelancer at the time and no longer a full-time employee of EMI. Therefore, he worked for months in a never ending project, preventing him from being paid.

Song information 

A concert promoting the album took place at the Palestra Itália Stadium in 1990. This concert's recording was released as a live album in 2004, under the name As Quatro Estações ao Vivo. During that performance, Russo said "Pais e Filhos" was written in the bathroom, and dedicated it to "everyone who thinks a cockroach is more important than the people we love". That was a response to Paulinho Moska, then vocalist of Brazilian punk band Inimigos do Rei, stating that the band's song "Uma Barata Chamada Kafka" (A Cockroach Named Kafka) was as good as Legião Urbana's song. Moska later covered "Meninos e Meninas", a song from this album.

According to Bahia, the song was born with a lot of guitar layers and spare sounds, as if many songs existed in a single one. In order to solve it, he returned to cutting and gluing tape sections with duck tape. The song's lyrics discuss suicide. In 1994, when the band was performing at SBT's Programa Livre, Russo reprehended the audience after they happilly reacted to the announcement that they would play the song:

The song "Feedback Song for a Dying Friend" is a tribute to American photographer Robert Mapplethorpe, a couple of friends and Cazuza, who suffered from AIDS, a disease that would eventually kill him in 1990 and Russo in 1996. The album booklet has a translation of the lyrics. Originally, the song would be in Portuguese, with the name "Rapazes Católicos" (Catholic Guys). However, the lyrics were rejected (the band itself considered them "unpublishable") and changed to the final version in English, while retaining the original instrumental base. The translation is signed by Millôr Fernandes. Initially, Fernandes refused to do it, stating he didn't do translations to English. However, he changed his mind after the band switched languages and asked him to do a translation to Portuguese, instead. He did the job for a "highly professional" pay and was impressed by Russo's handling of the language, including accurate citations of Shakespeare. Fernandes is considered the greatest translator of Shakespeare for theater.

The lyrics of "1965 (Duas Tribos)" refer to Revell models and Hanna-Barbera Studios. With "Meninos e Meninas", Russo suggested his bisexuality. Brazilian rock band Titãs covered "Sete Cidades" on their album As Dez Mais.
The ending of "Se Fiquei Esperando Meu Amor Passar" includes the Agnus Dei in Portuguese, ending the album with a prayer.

Track listing

Certifications

Personnel
Legião Urbana
 Renato Russo: vocals, acoustic and electric guitars, bass guitar, keyboards, harmonica
 Dado Villa-Lobos: electric and acoustic guitars, bass guitar, percussion, mandolin
 Marcelo Bonfá: drums, percussion, harmonica

References

 

1989 albums
Legião Urbana albums